Valeria Bufanu (née Ștefănescu; born 7 October 1946) is a retired Romanian athlete who mainly competed in hurdling and sprints.

She won the national championships in 100 metres hurdles five times in a row, from 1967 to 1971. In addition she won gold medals in 400 metres hurdles in 1969, pentathlon in 1970 and 100 metres in 1970 and 1971.

At the 1972 Summer Olympics in München, where the 100 metres hurdles event was held for the first time (the previous distance being 80 metres), Bufanu won a silver medal, sharing the podium with East Germans Annelie Ehrhardt (gold) and Karin Balzer (bronze). The next year Bufanu won a silver medal in 60 metres hurdles at the European Indoor Championships.

References

Sports Reference

Romanian female sprinters
Romanian female hurdlers
Athletes (track and field) at the 1968 Summer Olympics
Athletes (track and field) at the 1972 Summer Olympics
Athletes (track and field) at the 1976 Summer Olympics
Olympic athletes of Romania
1946 births
Living people
Medalists at the 1972 Summer Olympics
Olympic silver medalists for Romania
Olympic silver medalists in athletics (track and field)
Universiade medalists in athletics (track and field)
Universiade bronze medalists for Romania
Medalists at the 1970 Summer Universiade